Lake Arrowhead is an artificial lake in the towns of Waterboro and Limerick in York County, Maine, United States. The lake is an impoundment on the Little Ossipee River, which flows northeast to the Saco River in Limington. It is surrounded by the large residential Lake Arrowhead Community.

Arrowhead
Arrowhead
Limerick, Maine
Waterboro, Maine